Georges Martin may refer to:

 Georges Martin (freemason) (1844–1916), French doctor, politician and Freemason
 Georges Martin (cyclist) (1915–2010), French racing cyclist
 Georges Martin (engineer) (1930–2017), automotive engineer

See also
 Moto Martin, the company started by the engineer Georges Martin